Mankachar is a census town in South Salmara-Mankachar District in the Indian state of Assam. It is situated at the extreme south-westernmost end of North-East India

Geography
In the north there is Hatsingimari, in the east and south there is the state of Meghalaya and in the west there is the international border with Bangladesh.

Politics
Mankachar is part of Dhubri (Lok Sabha constituency).
It is the number 21 constituency of the Assam Legislative Assembly.

Major Political parties are : 
1. Indian National Congress INC
2. All India United Democratic Front AIUDF
3. Asom Gana Parishad AGP
4. Socialist Unity Centre of india(Communist) SUCI(C)

Education
 Mankachar College
 J.M.H.S School,Mankachar
 A.A Latif Girls Institution,Mankachar
 Little Star English Academy
 Green Valley English Academy
 Gyann Peeth Jatiyo Vidyalaya
 Sonali Axom Jatiyo Vidyalaya

Medical
 Community Health Centre, Mankachar
Brahmaputra eye care and Nursing home, Mankachar
Brahmaputra X -ray, Mankachar
Anju Health Care Diagnostic Center
 Noor Enterprise (Wholesale Medicine Distributor)

Notable People
 Adv.Aminul Islam, Current MLA - 21 Mankachar Constituency, General Secretary & Chief Spokesperson (AIUDF), Politician, Social Worker 
 Kobad Hussain Ahmed, First MLA of Mankachar Constituency, Politician
 Zahirul Islam, former Minister of Assam, Politician
 Aminul Islam, former Minister of Assam, Politician

References

Cities and towns in South Salmara-Mankachar district